Gianluca Spinelli (born 29 October 1966) is an Italian professional football goalkeeper coach. He is a goalkeeper coach for French club Paris Saint-Germain and the Italy national football team.

Coaching career
Spinelli began his career as a goalkeeper coach at local team Como in 2002; as a player, he had previously served as a reserve goalkeeper for the club behind Alex Brunner, and helped the team achieve promotion to Serie A in 2002, starting in his side's decisive 2–0 home win over Empoli at the Stadio Giuseppe Sinigaglia, and keeping a clean sheet.

After spending two years with the Lariani, he was picked up by Serie A team Genoa C.F.C. He spent 12 years at Genoa, serving under 16 managers, and coaching several goalkeepers (in particular Mattia Perin), and helping lead the club out of the Serie C, (Now Lega Pro) to the top flight; during his time with the club, he earned a reputation as one of the best goalkeeping coaches in Italy.

From 2014 Spinelli joined manager Antonio Conte as part of the coaching staff of the Italy national football team, maintaining the dual role of goalkeeping coach for both Genoa and Italy. After Italy's 6–5 penalty shootout loss to Germany in the Euro 2016 quarter-finals, Spinelli followed Conte to English club Chelsea. He held the dual role of goalkeeping coach for both the Italy national football team and Chelsea. During the 2016–17 Premier League season, Chelsea's starting goalkeeper Thibaut Courtois praised Spinelli's abilities as a goalkeeping coach, and has credited Spinelli for helping him to improve his overall game and technique, in particular his foot-work and diving, which enabled him to be more explosive and get to ground more quickly. Chelsea finished the season as Premier League Champions. The following season, Chelsea won the FA Cup.

After Antonio Conte was sacked by Chelsea in July 2018, Spinelli joined Paris Saint-Germain as the team's new goalkeeping, where he was re-united with former Italy goalkeeper Gianluigi Buffon. He continued to hold a dual role as both Paris Saint-Germain's goalkeeping coach, and the goalkeeping coach of the Italian national team, under manager Roberto Mancini.

Honours

Goalkeeping coach
Genoa
Serie B: 2006–07 (Promoted)
Serie C1: 2005–06 (Runner-up)

Chelsea
Premier League: 2016–17
FA Cup: 2017–18

Paris Saint-Germain
Ligue 1: 2018–19
Trophée des Champions: 2018, 2019

Individual
Serie A Goalkeeping coach of the Year: 2011–12, 2014–15, 2015–16

References

1966 births
Living people
Italian footballers
Sportspeople from Milan
Association football goalkeepers
Paris Saint-Germain F.C. non-playing staff
Chelsea F.C. non-playing staff
Association football goalkeeping coaches